Escaro is a commune in the Pyrénées-Orientales department in southern France.

Geography

Localisation 
Escaro is located in the canton of Les Pyrénées catalanes and in the arrondissement of Prades.

History 
On 20 March 1822, the commune of Aytua is linked to Escaro.

Population

See also
Communes of the Pyrénées-Orientales department

References

Communes of Pyrénées-Orientales